The following is a list of proven scandals in India since independence, including political, financial and corporate scandals. The year, or decade, is when the scandal was first reported.

1940s
 1947 - INA treasure chest disappearance
 1948 - Jeep scandal case
 1949 - Gems Graft case

1950s
 1951 Cycle scam
 1956 BHU funds misappropriation
 1958 Mundhra scandal

1960s
 1960 Teja loan scandal
 1964 Pratap Singh Kairon inquiry
 1965 Kalinga tubes scandal

1970s
 1971 Nagarwala case
 1974 Maruti scandal
 1976 Kuo oil scandal

1980s
 1981 Cement scam
 1985 Fodder scam
 1987 HDW Submarine scandal
 1987 Bofors scandal
 1989 St Kitts forgery

1990s
 1992 Indian stock market scam 5000 crores
 Babanrao Gholap disproportionate-assets case
 1996 disproportionate assets case against Jayalalithaa
 Cobbler scam
 1998 Ajmer rape case
 1998 Anubhav Plantations scam
 Jalgaon housing scam
 Sheregar scam
 Ice cream parlour sex scandal
 1996 Sukh Ram telecom equipment scandal
 C. R. Bhansali scam
 Fertiliser import scam
 Meghalaya forest scam
 Preferential allotment scam
 Yugoslav dinar scam
 Purulia arms drop case
 Sugar-import scam
 Palmolein Oil Import Scam (Kerala)
 Indian Bank scandal
 Airbus scandal
 Hawala scandal
 SNC-Lavalin Kerala hydroelectric scandal
 Prem Khandu Thungan graft case

2000s

2000
 India-South Africa match fixing scandal - Mohammed Azharuddin and Ajay Jadeja were banned from cricket for 5 years and 4 years respectively.

2001
 Operation West End
 Ketan Parekh securities scam
 Calcutta Stock Exchange scam
 Roshni Act corruption scandal

2002
 Stamp paper scam
 Provident Fund scam
 Taj corridor case

2003
 Housing and Urban Development Corporation scam
 Andhra Pradesh Social Welfare scholarship scam 
Uttar Pradesh food grain scam
 Haryana teacher-recruitment scam

2004
 Taj Co-operative Group Housing Scheme scam
 IPO scam
 Bihar flood-relief scam
 Oil for Food scandal

2005
 Bhanu Pratap Sahi disproportionate-assets case, Jharkhand medical-equipment scam
 Scorpene deal scam, part of the Navy war room leak

2006
 Punjab city-centre project scam
 Uttar Pradesh ayurveda scam
 Navy war room leak (6 billion)
 Fatwas for cash scandal

2008
 Hasan Ali Khan money-laundering case
 State Bank of Saurashtra scam
 Army ration-pilferage scam
 Paazee Forex scam
 Cash at judge's door scam
2G spectrum case (Not Proved)
 Power-theft scandal
 Cash-for-votes scandal

2009
 Goa special economic zone scam
 JVG scam
 Rice export scam
 Orissa paddy scam
 Sukhna land scam (Darjeeling)
 Vasundhara Raje Deendayal Upadhyaya Trust land scam
 Austral Coke scam
 Gujarat VDSGCU sugarcane scam
 Madhu Koda disproportionate-assets case
 Satyam scandal

2010s

2010
 Housing-loan scam
 Indian Space Research Organisation S-band scam, also known as the ISRO-Devas deal
 Andhra Pradesh Emmar scam
 Karnataka land scam
 Karnataka housing-board scam (₹350 million)
 Uttarakhand Citurgia land scam
 Medical Council of India bribery scandal - Ketan Desai was arrested by CBI on 22 April.
 Chandigarh booth scam
 Odisha illegal-mining scam (₹59,203 crore)
Concerns and controversies over the 2010 Commonwealth Games
 Maharashtra Adarsh Housing Society scam
 Gegong Apang PDS scam

2011
 Belekeri port scam, estimated loss to the public exchequer at ₹35,000 crores (approx US$6 billion)
 Tatra scam
 National Technical Research Organisation scam
 Goa mining scam
 Bruhat Bengaluru Mahanagara Palike scam
 Himachal Pradesh housing scam
 Pune housing scam
 Pune land scam
 Orissa pulse scam
 Kerala investment scam
 Mumbai sales tax fraud
 Maharashtra education scam
 Maharashtra public distribution system scam
 Uttar Pradesh Teacher Eligibility Test scam
 Uttar Pradesh Mahatma Gandhi National Rural Employment Guarantee Act (MGNREGA) scam
 Orissa MGNREGA scam
 Indian Air Force land scam
 Bihar solar lamp scam
 B. L. Kashyap, Employees' Provident Fund Organisation scam
 Assam education scam
 Pune ULC scam

2012
 Aadhaar scam
 Andhra Pradesh liquor scam
 Bengaluru mayor's fund scam
 Bharat Earth Movers housing-society scam
 Delhi surgical-glove procurement scam
 DIAL Scam
 Flying Club fraud – 
 Foreign exchange derivatives scam
 Girivan land scam
 Granite scam in Tamil Nadu (about )
 Haryana forest scam
 Himachal Pradesh pulse scam
Indian coal allocation scam (Not Proved)
Jalgaon housing scam 
 Jammu and Kashmir Cricket Association scam (about )
 Jammu and Kashmir PHE scam
 Jammu and Kashmir recruitment scam
 Jammu and Kashmir exam scandal
 Karnataka Wakf Board Land Scam
 Maharashtra stamp duty scam
 Maharashtra land scam
 Maharashtra Housing and Area Development Authority repair scam
 Maharashtra Irrigation Scam (about )
 Ministry of External Affairs gift scam
 MSTC gold-export scam
 Nayagaon, Punjab land scam
 NHAI allegations – The World Bank's Institutional Integrity Unit identified fraud and corruption, requesting an investigation.
 NHPC cement scam
 Patiala land scam
 Punjab paddy scam
 Ranchi real-estate scam
 Service Tax and Central Excise fraud
 Tax refund scam
 Taxpayer identification number scam
 Toilet scam
Uttar Pradesh NRHM scam
 Ultra Mega Power Projects scam – The central government lost  due to undue benefits to Reliance Power.
 Uttar Pradesh elephant-memorial scam (₹1,400 crore)
 Uttar Pradesh horticulture scam
 Uttar Pradesh Labour and Construction Co-operative Federation scam
 Uttar Pradesh palm tree plantation scam
 Uttar Pradesh seed scam
 Uttar Pradesh stamp duty scam

2013
 Virbhadra Singh bribery controversy (₹2.4 crore)
 Madhya Pradesh pre-medical test scam
 Madhya Pradesh wheat-procurement scam (₹4 crore)
 Arvind and Tinoo Joshi disproportionate-assets case (Madhya Pradesh)
 Delhi-Gurgaon Toll Plaza scam
 Employees' Provident Fund Organisation scam
 Haryana seed scam (₹5 crore)
 Directorate General of Civil Aviation "free ticket" scam
 Leave Travel Concession scam
 Telangana rape victim names & Mother reaction 2019
 NSEL case (₹5,500 crore)
 Railway iron ore freight scam (₹17,000 crore)
 Uttar Pradesh illegal sand mining
 Vodafone tax controversy (₹11,000 crore)
 Railway bribery scam - The CBI arrested railway minister Pawan Kumar Bansal's nephew for allegedly accepting a  bribe for a Railway Board member.
 2013 Indian Premier League spot-fixing and betting case
 2013 Kerala solar panel scam
 Odisha land-allotment scam)
 2013 Indian helicopter bribery scandal
 Madhya Pradesh Scholarship scam
 Saradha Group financial scandal: Collapse of a Ponzi scheme run by Saradha Group, a consortium of over 200 private companies believed to be running so-called chit funds
 MBBS seats scam - Rasheed Masood was sentenced to four years imprisonment and expelled from the Rajya Sabha.

2014
 Mumbai International Airport scam - FIRs were registered against GVK and Airports Authority of India officials for cheating and forgery. The project was deliberately delayed for three years to funnel ₹5,000 crore to GVK.
 Aavin scam - Ten-year adulteration of milk supplied from societies of the Tamil Nadu State Milk Union, estimated at 27 lakh per day. The owner of the truck was arrested in Chennai.
 SmartCity, Kochi scam - Joint venture of the government of Kerala and TECOM Investments, a subsidiary of Dubai Holding
Cash for MLC seat scam - H. D. Kumaraswamy
 Pratapsingh Rane bribery case
 Illegal mining in the Aravalli Range (Haryana and Rajasthan)
 Siliguri Jalpaiguri Development Authority scam, West Bengal (₹200 crore)
 Reliance Jio spectrum-auction-rigging scam-
Odisha industrial-land mortgage scam (₹52,000 crore)
National Herald land scam
Vyapam scam - based in Madhya Pradesh. Though related to Entrance Exams manipulation, this scam has very high number of unnatural deaths associated with it. Incidentally it is also one of the Most viewed article in Wikipedia.
Madhya Pradesh farmer welfare and agriculture development minister Gauri Shankar Chaturbhuj Bisen disproportionate assets case (₹2,000 crore)
Hari Kumar Jha disproportionate assets case (₹15 crore)
Nationalist Congress Party (NCP) unaccounted-cash case (₹34 crore)
Haryana Urban Development Authority (HUDA) discretionary quota plot scam
Jyotiraditya Madhavrao Scindia land-grab case
 R. C. Kuriel disproportionate assets case (Madhya Pradesh)
 Mayank Jain disproportionate assets case
 Rajasthan Housing Board (RHB) arbitrary lease allotment of property
 HPCA illegal land-allotments scandal- Prem Kumar Dhumal and Anurag Thakur have been charge sheeted in HPCA scam.
Indian Railways-RailTel Corporation of India mobile scam
 Hindustan Aeronautics Limited and Rolls-Royce defence scam (₹10,000 crore)
 Air India Family Fare Scheme scam
 Bokaro Steel Plant recruitment scam
 Gujarat arbitrary land-allotments scandal
 Kribhco and Yara International fertilizer fraud controversy
 Delhi Jal Board scam (₹10,000 crore)
 Indian Railways "emergency quota" ticket scam
 Cremation shed scam- Rajya Sabha MP T. M. Selvaganapathy was sentenced to two years and resigned for corruption.
 Maharashtra money laundering - A special investigative team was formed to probe Chhagan Bhujbal and his family.

2015
The Supreme Court found that the Ministry of Housing and Urban Poverty Alleviation's National Urban Livelihood Mission had built only 208 houses for nine lakh (900,000) homeless people, although the central government had allocated  to the mission.
Delhi Jal Board tanker scam (₹400 crore) – Former Delhi chief minister Sheila Dikshit was accused of floating costly tenders. The government of Delhi's Anti-Corruption Branch filed an FIR against Dikshit and Delhi CM Arvind Kejriwal. 
 Amethi Rajiv Gandhi Charitable Trust land-grab case - A revenue court ordered the return of land sold to the Rajiv Gandhi Charitable Trust by an industrial house to the Uttar Pradesh State Industrial Development Corporation.
Delhi CNG scam (₹100 crore) - Former Delhi Chief Minister Sheila Dikshit and Lieutenant Governor Najeeb Jung were accused in the scam.
Delhi power scam - The CAG reported that Reliance Anil Dhirubhai Ambani Group subsidiary BRPL is accused of inflating their rates by almost ₹8,000 crore, and rates in the city should be reduced. 
Gujarat fisheries scam (₹400 crore) - Gujarat ministers Purshottam Solanki and Dileepbhai Sanghani were accused of illegally granting fishing contracts for 58 reservoirs.
 GIDC plot-allotment bribery case - Goa chief minister Laxmikant Parsekar's brother-in-law Dilip Malvankar, a field manager attached to the Goa Industrial Development Corporation (GIDC), was arrested while allegedly accepting a ₹10,000 bribe to allot a plot in the Tuem Industrial Estate.
 Mizoram office of profit scam - Health minister Lal Thanzara (brother of chief minister Lal Thanhawla) resigned from the cabinet for allegedly holding a 21.6 percent share in Sunshine Overseas, a road construction company which had received government contracts.
 Maharashtra Annabhau Sathe Development Corporation scam (₹141 crore) – MLA Ramesh Kadam was arrested by the CID for siphoning funds from the state-run ASDC.
 Uttarakhand liquor-license scandal - Uttarakhand chief minister Harish Rawat and his secretary, Mohammed Shahid, were seen negotiating with a liquor baron for a ₹100-crore bribe to change the state's policy on the sale of alcohol.
 Nagpur land-grab case - The high court of Maharashtra fined Member of Parliament Vijay J. Darda and ex-chief minister of Maharashtra Ashok Chavan ₹25,000 each and ordered an enquiry into encroachment by Jawaharlal Darda Education Society, controlled by Vijay and Rajendra Darda
 Integrated Child Development Services "Chikki" controversy (₹206 crore) - Maharashtra women and child welfare minister Pankaja Munde did not solicit mandatory e-tenders in awarding contracts to vendors.
Bangalore illegal land de-notification scam B. S. Yeddyurappa, chief minister of Karnataka, was the prime suspect.
 Virbhadra Singh disproportionate-assets case (₹6 crore) - The CBI registered a preliminary enquiry of Himachal Pradesh chief minister Virbhadra Singh.
 NTC land scam (₹709 crore) - The CBI booked former Gujarat CM Shankersinh Vaghela.
 Lalit Modi corruption case - The former Indian Premier League (IPL) commissioner used eight credit cards, none of which were in his name.
 2015 Cash for Vote Scam - MLA Revanth Reddy was jailed in Telangana.
 Corporate espionage - Officials of Reliance Industries, Reliance Anil Dhirubhai Ambani Group, Essar Group, Cairn India and Jubilant Energy were accused of stealing documents from the Petroleum Ministry.
 Uttarakhand flood-relief scam (₹100 crore) - When hundreds of thousands of people in Uttarakhand went hungry during the 2013 floods, state officials partied on flood-relief funds.
 NSE co-location scam (about ₹50,000 crore) – Insider trading on the National Stock Exchange of India (NSE) from 2010 to 2014 The case came to light in 2015.
 Louis Berger Group bribery case - Former Goa public-works minister Churchill Alemao and former chief minister of Goa Digambar Kamat were the prime suspects. Alemao was arrested, and Kamat applied for anticipatory bail. Louis Berger Group officials were arrested after they admitted the bribe to the Goa minister.

2016
Narada sting operation
Freedom 251 scam - A ponzi scheme, that was mounted by an entrepreneur named Mohit Goel through a company called Ringing Bells Private Limited. The company promised Mobile phones at 251 Indian rupee to customers and collected money. They failed to meet the obligation.
Fugitive Economic Offender, Vijay Mallya escaped from India on March 2, 2016, through Jet Airways Delhi - London  flight from Indira Gandhi International Airport.
PACL scam

2017
 Noida Ponzi scheme - A special investigation team (SIT) probing an alleged Ponzi scheme run by Anubhav Mittal, managing director of Ablaze Info Solution, concentrated their efforts on suspicious transactions by nearly 200 gold and diamond dealers.
 Maharashtra scholarship scam - An investigation of alleged misappropriation of government scholarships intended for Other Backward Class students found that hundreds of institutes across the state had pocketed several thousand crore rupees since 2010.
 On 5 April 2017, the CBI registered six cases against Winsome Diamonds and Jewellery and Forever Precious Jewellery and Diamonds and their chief promoter, Jatin Mehta, for allegedly cheating three government banks of ₹1,530 crore.
 A public-interest litigation petition was filed against Adani Group, Reliance Group, Essar Group and other mining and energy companies for an investigation of alleged  overcharges for Indonesian coal and imported power equipment from 2011 to 2015.

2018
Rotomac bank fraud: According to an 18 February 2010 Central Bureau of Investigation first information report, Rotomac allegedly defaulted on loans worth  crore. The FIR said that Rotomac diverted the loans to a fictitious company, which routed the money back to Rotomac.
Punjab National Bank Scam: A fraudulent letter of undertaking worth  (1.77 billion) was issued at the Punjab National Bank branch in Brady House, Mumbai, making the bank liable for the amount. The fraudulent transactions, linked to Nirav Modi, were first noticed by a new employee of the bank. Two branch employees were involved in the scam, in which the bank's core banking system was bypassed to raise payment notes to overseas branches of other Indian banks (including Allahabad Bank, Axis Bank and Union Bank of India) with the Society for Worldwide Interbank Financial Telecommunication. Three jewellers (Gitanjali Group and its subsidiaries, Gili and Nakshatra) are also under investigation. Mehul Choksi is also accused in the scandal.

2019
Karvy Scam
PMC Bank scam
DHFL scam and UPPCL employee provident fund (EPF) scandal
INX Media case against former Union Minister P. Chidambaram
IMA ponzi scheme
D. K. Shivakumar money-laundering case
Cox & Kings scam
IL&FS scam and fraud
Misuse of Clients' Funds by Amrapali Aadya Trading and Investments Private Limited and 8 others
Kanva Scandal

2020s

2020
 Kerala gold smuggling scandal: On June 30, 2020, The customs officials at the airport detained diplomatic baggage from Dubai which turned out to be a consignment carrying illegal gold. This smuggling is alleged to have connection with top echelons of Kerala Government and is under probe by agencies such as National Investigation Agency, Enforcement Directorate etc.
 Fake TRP Scam - In October 2020, Mumbai Police filed a charge sheet against India Today, News Nation, Republic TV, and multiple Marathi channels on grounds of manipulation of TRP.
 Roshni Land Scam - The Rs. 25,000 crore scam was earlier highlighted in CAG audit of 2013. In November 2020, CBI registered cases of land grab by wealthy and people in position of power by misusing provisions of acts that give government land to landless people in Jammu and Kashmir.
 Guru Raghavendra Bank scam: Co-operative bank in Bangalore scammed innocent citizens.
 Sandalwood drug scandal: In the month of August and September Karnataka Police arrested and quizzed numerous actors and individuals working in Kannada cinema industry in connection with drug abuse and peddling.
 PM Kisan Nidhi scam in Tamil Nadu, where Rs. 110 crore was siphoned off to ineligible beneficiaries.
 Belli Belaku Scam: Around 2000 innocent victims were scammed in Bangalore by abusing Karnataka Souharda Sahakari Act.Karnataka Government entrusted investigation to SIT, CID and its prosecution to Karnataka Police. While a Competent Authority was constituted under the provisos of Protection of Interest of Depositors in Financial Establishments Act. Prima facie reports indicates that the scam involves overall emblazonment of arround 20 crores from collective public funds. Many Belli Belaku Scam perpetrators are also co-accused in Guru Raghavendra Bank scam implying criminal nexus among crimes.

2021
 Vazegate Scandal: In March 2021, following the Mukesh Ambani bomb scare case the NIA after taking over the Mumbai Police investigation, noted that a police officer, Sachin Vaze and Mumbai Police Commissioner Param Bir Singh had played a role in the whole case of planning the bombs. Param Bir Singh who was later transferred wrote a letter to the Maharashtra Chief Minister Uddhav Thackeray that the Home Minister of state Anil Deshmukh had asked him to collect Rs 110 crore every month. Many substantial pieces of evidence followed this letter.
 2021 Recruitment scam: On complaint from Brigadier (Vigilance) V K Purohit, alleging that on February 28, 2021, input was received about the alleged involvement of serving personnel in accepting bribes for clearance of review medical exam of temporarily rejected officer candidates at the Base Hospital in New Delhi Central Bureau of Investigation registered the FIR. After which the agency carried out searches at 30 locations across the country. The CBI has booked 17 Army officers including five officers of Lt Col rank, and six private persons in connection with alleged irregularities in recruitment for the armed forces. Lt Col MVSNA Bhagwan is alleged to be the mastermind of the recruitment racket, sources said. Several lower-ranking Army officials and relatives of the accused officers have also been booked.
 Pegasus Snooping Scandal: An international investigative journalism initiative by the name of Pegasus Project that alleged that the Pegasus spyware was used on several individuals including ministers, opposition leaders, political strategists, judges, journalists, administrators and activists.

2022
 Charity Scandal: On 10 February 2022, the Enforcement Directorate attached assets of worth 1.77 crore from journalist Rana Ayyub under the money laundering act. An ED official said that the donation she collected for three funds, during the COVID-19 pandemic were not used for the right purposes. Most of the donation was declared as taxable personal income and used for personal expenses. Income tax was paid on the donation.
 Siri Vaibhava Scam: On 18 June 2022, Karnataka State Souharda Federal Cooperative has filed a criminal complaint with Karnataka State police against board members of Srivaibhava Souharda Pattina Sahakari Niyamitha for allegedly cheating investors. Prima facie reports indicates that the scam involves overall emblazonment of arround 350 crores from collective public funds. Many Siri Vaibhava Scam perpetrators are also co-accused in Guru Raghavendra Bank scam implying criminal nexus among crimes.
 School Service Commission  Job Scandal West Bengal: On 23 July 2022, Partha Chatterjee was arrested from his residence by the Enforcement Directorate in connection with the alleged State School Service Commission (SSC) recruitment scam cases along with his aide actress Arpita Mukherjee. He was admitted to SSKM Hospital after complaining of chest pains.  Later, he was shifted to AIIMS Bhubaneswar where doctors said that he suffers from chronic diseases but does not need immediate hospitalization. He is currently in the custody of the Enforcement Directorate. As of 28 July 2022, the Enforcement Directorate has recovered ₹49.8 Crores cash, gold worth ₹5.07 Crores, ₹56 lakhs worth foreign currency and coded diaries from properties related to him and Arpita Mukherjee. On 28 July he was expelled from the cabinet Ministries he was in charge of and suspended from the TMC. On 5 August 2022, he and his aide Arpita Mukherjee were sent to jail custody.
There is a lady named Annwesha Mukherjee who claimed herself to be a close aide of the Partha Chatterjee cheated many innocent people by promising them jobs in Indian Railways, SSC and other government jobs. She had also cheated many people across India on various pretext and was involved in various Scams. She was arrested but now in bail custody.
Staff Scandal In September 2022,West Bengal : The Court had ordered cancellation of 1,911 jobs in group D & C positions in state-run and -aided schools after finding manipulation in their Optical Mark Recognition (Blank OMR) sheets but no one arrested. In 2023 ,  kuntal ghosh was arrested for TET 2022 by ED.

See also

 The Lokpal and Lokayuktas Act, 2013
 Corruption in India
 2011 Indian anti-corruption movement
 Jan Lokpal Bill
 Right to Public Services legislation
 Corruption Perceptions Index
 Licence Raj
 Mafia Raj
 Rent-seeking
 Lok Ayukta
 United Nations Convention Against Corruption

Further reading
Shourie, A. (2006). Indian Controversies. New Delhi: Rupa & Co.
In 2020, Real Estate Scam Fighters is formed with a basic mission to debunk various Frauds in the real estate sector and create awareness for the investors.

References

 
Scandals
India